Rosalia or Rosalía (with diacritic) may refer to:

Persons
 Rosalia (given name)
 Saint Rosalia (1130–1166), the patron saint of Palermo in Italy
 Rosalía (born 1992), Spanish singer

Places
 314 Rosalia, an asteroid
 Rosalia, Pisidia, an ancient city and former bishopric in Pisidia, now in Asian Turkey and a Latin Catholic titular see
 Rosalia, Washington, USA

Other uses
 Rosalia (beetle), a genus of beetles
 Rosalia (festival), a flower festival in the Roman Empire
 Sequential modulation or rosalia
 "Rosalía", a song by Yung Beef from ADROMICFMS 4

See also

 Santa Rosalía (disambiguation)
 
 Rosalie (disambiguation)
 "Rosealia", a song by Better Than Ezra
 Roselia (disambiguation)